The Wall Street Journal Special Editions is a venture launched in 1994 by The Wall Street Journal to expand its readership abroad, especially in the Americas.  It publishes pages, bearing the Journal's banner, within major daily and weekly newspapers around the world featuring selected content from The Wall Street Journal.  Its Special Editions are carried in 37 newspapers in 35 countries, translated into 10 languages, with a total combined circulation of 5.2 million.

The Wall Street Journal Americas is the Special Editions' centerpiece, published in Spanish and Portuguese in 18 Latin American nations.

Full List of Wall Street Journal Special Editions

Wall Street Journal Americas
(note: the following figures are correct as of December 2004)

Other Special Editions

Special Editions
Business newspapers
Publications established in 1994